Pirithoüs is an opera by the French composer Jean-Joseph Mouret, first performed at the Académie Royale de Musique (the Paris Opera) on 26 January 1723. It takes the form of a tragédie en musique in a prologue and five acts. The libretto is by Jean-Louis-Ignace de La Serre. The opera takes its name from the King Pirithous of Greek mythology.

The premiere was considered very successful, although Le Mercure said that the main scenes wasn't as interesting as hoped for, but overall the opera was lively, pleasureful, and brilliant.

Sources
 Libretto at "Livrets baroques"

References

French-language operas
Tragédies en musique
Operas by Jean-Joseph Mouret
Operas
1723 operas